Zaidi bin Attan is a Malaysian politician who has served as Member of the Melaka State Executive Council (EXCO) in the Barisan Nasional (BN) state administration under Chief Minister Sulaiman Md Ali since November 2021 and Member of the Melaka State Legislative Assembly (MLA) for Serkam since May 2013. He served as Deputy Member of Melaka State EXCO under former Chief Minister Idris Haron from May 2013 to the collapse of the BN state administration in May 2018. He is a member of the United Malays National Organisation (UMNO), a component party of the ruling BN coalition.

Election results

Honours
  :
  Companion Class I of the Order of Malacca (DMSM) – Datuk (2015)

References 

Malaysian people of Malay descent
Malaysian Muslims
United Malays National Organisation politicians
21st-century Malaysian politicians
Members of the Malacca State Legislative Assembly
Malacca state executive councillors
People from Malacca
Living people
1968 births